ScratchJr is a visual programming language designed to introduce programming skills to children ages 5–7. The app is considered an introductory programming language. It is available as a free app for iOS, Android and Chromebook.

ScratchJr is a derivative of the Scratch language, which has been used by over 10 million people worldwide. Programming in Scratch requires basic reading skills, however, so the creators saw a need for another language which would provide a simplified way to learn programming at a younger age and without any reading or mathematics required.

History
ScratchJr was developed by a collaborative team including Marina Umaschi Bers at Tufts University, Mitchel Resnick at the MIT Media Lab, and Paula Bonta and Brian Silverman at the Playful Invention Company. The project was given a $1.3 million grant from the National Science Foundation and raised additional funds on the Kickstarter platform. The initial release was launched in July 2014 for iPad; an Android version was released in March 2015 and a Chromebook app followed in March 2016. There is also a version called PBS Kids ScratchJr, which was released in partnership with PBS Kids in 2015. This version has sprites and backgrounds drawn from popular children's animated series such as Nature Cat and Wild Kratts.

User interface 

Children create code in objects called sprites - which can be characters or other objects. ScratchJr comes with a library of sprites, and sprites can be edited or new ones created using the "Paint Editor".

Code is created by dragging blocks into a coding area and snapping them together. All the blocks are completely icon-based (no text) which is how children can use this language before they can read. Blocks are connected from left to right, like words.

The user interface is much simpler than that of Scratch. Both the number of categories of programming blocks and the number of blocks within each category have been reduced, so that only most basic ones were retained.

In addition to sprites, kids can add backgrounds to projects, to give them a setting and atmosphere. Each background is treated like a page in a book, and has its own set of sprites. A project can have a maximum of 4 backgrounds.

Use in school settings
It has been used in kindergarten classrooms at the Eliot-Pearson Children's School in Medford, affiliated with the Tufts University, and in the Jewish Community Day School in Watertown, Boston.

Languages
ScratchJr is available in Catalan, Chinese, Danish, English, French, German, Italian, Japanese, Norwegian, Polish, Portuguese, Brazilian Portuguese, Spanish, Swedish, Thai, Turkish and Welsh.

References

External links 
 

Visual programming languages
Educational programming languages
Free educational software
2014 software
Pedagogic integrated development environments
MIT Media Lab